Fall of Mexico City may refer to the following historical events:
Fall of Tenochtitlán, Spanish conquest of the Aztec capital — 1521
Battle for Mexico City, United States defeats Mexico during the Mexican–American War — 1847
Capture of Mexico City (1863) by France during their 2nd intervention
Siege of Mexico City, successful siege of the Imperial-held city by Mexican Republicans — 1867

Battles involving Mexico
Mexico City-related lists
History of Mexico City